Brita Lindholm (born 12 December 1963) is a Swedish curler. She is a 1983 Swedish women's champion.

Teams

References

External links
 

Living people
1963 births
Swedish female curlers
Swedish curling champions